Sir Thomas Baring, 2nd Baronet (12 June 1772 – 3 April 1848), was a British banker and Member of Parliament.

Early life
Baring was born on 12 June 1772.  A member of the Baring family, he was the eldest son of Harriet (née Herring) Baring and Sir Francis Baring, 1st Baronet, founder of Barings Bank.

His grandfather, John (Johann) Baring, had emigrated from Germany and established the family in England. His maternal grandfather was merchant William Herring of Croydon and among his mother's family was her cousin, Thomas Herring, Archbishop of Canterbury.

Career
From 1790 and 1801, he worked with the Honourable East India Company. Thomas became a partner in Baring Brothers & Co. in 1804, remaining until 1809. Upon his father's death in, 1810, he succeeded Sir Francis Baring, 1st Baronet.

After his early career with the bank, Sir Thomas was elected a British Member of Parliament for the constituencies of High Wycombe and Hampshire until 1831.

From 1832 to 1833 he was the chairman of the London and South Western Railway. He was president of the London Institution and Director of the British Institution. In June 1841, he was elected a Fellow of the Royal Society.

Personal life
On 3 September 1794, he married Mary Ursula Sealy (1774–1846) in Calcutta, India.  Mary was the daughter of Charles Sealy. Together, they were the parents of four sons and five daughters, including:

 Francis Baring (1796–1866), who married Jane Grey, fifth daughter of Hon. Sir George Grey, 1st Baronet. After her death, he married Lady Arabella Howard, second daughter of Kenneth Howard, 1st Earl of Effingham.
 Thomas Baring (1799–1873), a banker and MP for Great Yarmouth and Huntingdon.
 John Baring (1801–1888), who married Charlotte Amelia Porcher, daughter of Reverend George Porcher.
 Mary Ursula Baring (–1812), who died in childhood.
 Charlotte Baring (1805–1871), who married Reverend William Maxwell du Pré, brother of Caledon Du Pré, MP.
 Charles Baring (1807–1879), who became the Bishop of Durham.
 Lydia Dorothy Baring (–1812), who died young.
 Frances Baring (1813–1850), who married Henry Labouchere, 1st Baron Taunton.

On 3 April 1848, aged 75, he died at his residence Stratton Park House, East Stratton, Hampshire. He was succeeded in the baronetcy by his eldest son who was later raised to the peerage in 1866 as Baron Northbrook.

References

External links 
 
 

1772 births
1848 deaths
Thomas Baring
Baronets in the Baronetage of Great Britain
Members of the Parliament of the United Kingdom for English constituencies
UK MPs 1806–1807
UK MPs 1807–1812
UK MPs 1812–1818
UK MPs 1818–1820
UK MPs 1820–1826
UK MPs 1826–1830
UK MPs 1830–1831
UK MPs 1831–1832
Fellows of the Royal Society